The Beaver Bridge is a rail bridge spanning the Ohio River between Monaca and Beaver, Pennsylvania. The bridge currently carries two tracks of CSX Transportation.

The bridge was designed by Albert Lucius and built by McClintic-Marshall Company of Pittsburgh between March 1908 and May 1910 for the Pittsburgh and Lake Erie Railroad. The bridge is notable in that the railroad proceeded with the cantilever design despite the collapse of the Quebec cantilever bridge during construction in 1907.

See also 
List of bridges documented by the Historic American Engineering Record in Pennsylvania
List of crossings of the Ohio River

References

External links 

Monaca-Beaver Railroad Bridge at Bridges & Tunnels

Old photos of Beaver Bridge

Bridges completed in 1910
Bridges over the Ohio River
CSX Transportation bridges
Pittsburgh and Lake Erie Railroad
Railroad bridges in Pennsylvania
Historic American Engineering Record in Pennsylvania
Cantilever bridges in the United States
Truss bridges in the United States
Bridges in Beaver County, Pennsylvania
1910 establishments in Pennsylvania